Buck Elk Creek is a stream in southern Osage County in the U.S. state of Missouri. It is a tributary of the Gasconade River.

Buck Elk Creek was so named due to the presence of elk in the area.

See also
List of rivers of Missouri

References

Rivers of Osage County, Missouri
Rivers of Missouri
Tributaries of the Gasconade River